The F.W. Schuerenberg House is located in Brenham, Texas and was built in 1895 by Frederick William Schuerenberg. Schuerenberg, the son of an early German immigrant, was a local businessman who owned a blacksmith shop in Brenham. The mansion is located at 503 West Alamo street and is considered a classic  example of Victorian architecture. The Mansion was listed on the National Register of Historic Places in 1990. It sat vacant from 2005 to early 2016, when it was then purchased by a married couple from Houston who plan to restore it. It is said to be haunted by the spirit of a small girl who occasionally peers out the first floor bay window. it is also rumored that someone committed suicide by hanging themselves in the nursery located on the second floor. The old carriage house is located at the back of the lot on Peabody street. Its architectural style closely resembles that of the Wood-Hughes House which is also located in Brenham, Texas.

See also

National Register of Historic Places listings in Washington County, Texas
Recorded Texas Historic Landmarks in Washington County

References

External links

Houses on the National Register of Historic Places in Texas
Queen Anne architecture in Texas
Houses completed in 1895
Houses in Washington County, Texas
National Register of Historic Places in Washington County, Texas
Recorded Texas Historic Landmarks
Brenham, Texas